Bocking or Böcking may refer to:

Bocking, Essex, a village near Braintree, Essex, England
Bocking 14, a cultivated strain of the plant Comfrey
Powerbocking, the use of powered stilts patented by Alexander Böck
Bill Bocking (1902–1985), English footballer
Edward Bocking (died 1534), English monk during the reign of King Henry VIII
Eduard Böcking (1802–1870), German legal scholar
Henry Bocking (1835–1907), English cricketer
Kai Böcking (born 1964), German television presenter
Ralph Bocking (died 1270), English Dominican
Richard Bocking (1931–2012), Canadian filmmaker
Stuart Bocking (born 1969), Australian radio presenter